Wendy Smith (born 31 May 1963) is an English musician, best known as being a singer and guitarist in the band Prefab Sprout. In 2015, she became the director of creative learning at The Sage in Gateshead, Tyne and Wear, England.

Career
Smith was born in Middlesbrough, North Yorkshire, England.

Smith joined the band Prefab Sprout in 1983 after seeing them live in their early concerts, and featured on six of their studio albums as a singer, guitarist and keyboard player. The last album she recorded with the group was 1997's Andromeda Heights, though Smith herself admits that she didn't actually leave the band until 2001. One review of Prefab Sprout's second studio album, Steve McQueen, described Smith as having "fairy-dusted [the album with her] breathy harmonies."

After an inactive period of the band in the late 1990s, coupled with Smith being pregnant, she moved first into teaching, and then becoming the head of practitioner development at Sage Gateshead in 2003. She became head of learning and participation at The Sage in 2015.

In 2015, the Liberal Democrat leader Tim Farron announced at the party's annual conference that Smith was his teenage pin-up.

In 2021, Smith appeared on a single called "Winter Solstice" from poet Simon Armitage's band LYR.

Discography

Collaborations
Contradictions (as Paul Smith and The Intimations), (2015)

References

External links
BBC Music webpage

1963 births
Living people
English women singer-songwriters
English new wave musicians
Women new wave singers
People from Middlesbrough